A Cinderella Story: Once Upon a Song is a 2011 American teen comedy musical film directed by Damon Santostefano and starring Lucy Hale, Freddie Stroma, Megan Park, Matthew Lintz and Missi Pyle. It is a sequel to Another Cinderella Story (2008) and the third installment in A Cinderella Story series. In the film, a teenager dreams of being a singer, but her cruel stepmother and stepsister do everything they can to stop her from succeeding. When a new boy comes to school, she tries to get his attention using her voice. The film was released on DVD and digital on September 6, 2011, and premiered on ABC Family on January 22, 2012. The film was followed by A Cinderella Story: If the Shoe Fits (2016).

Plot
17-year-old aspiring singer, Katie Gibbs (Lucy Hale), is over-worked, bullied, and constantly harassed by her stepfamily, the Van Ravensways — shallow stepmother Gail (Missi Pyle), bratty teenage stepsister Beverly "Bev" (Megan Park), and younger troublemaking stepbrother Victor (Matthew Lintz). Despite how badly they treat her, Katie does their bidding with no complaints in fear that they might put her into foster care. Katie's parents died prior to the events of the movie.

In a dream, Katie performs a music video for her hit single ("Run This Town"). Then Victor wakes her up, demanding breakfast. At the Wellesley Academy of the Arts, of which Gail is headmistress, Guy Morgan (Dikran Tulaine) — English president of Kensington Records, enrolls his son, Luke (Freddie Stroma). Katie, wanting to change her life for the better, sneaks her demo CD into Guy's briefcase. Guy wants Luke to produce an upcoming showcase at the Academy; Luke, however, is less than excited about following in his dad's footsteps.

Back at home, Bev wants to win a recording contract with Guy: Bev, however, is a terrible singer; the more she practices, the worse she sounds. Guy calls Gail on Katie's cell phone, who is shocked to hear that he loves Katie's demo ("Bless Myself"). Gail lies, claiming it was Bev's demo and that Katie stole it. Meanwhile, Victor steals Katie's clothes and towel while she showers, and locks her out of the house, naked. Unable to get back inside, Katie trips over a visiting Luke; thinking fast, she covers herself up using the WELCOME mat. Amused by the situation, Luke gives her his jacket. While Bev welcomes Luke, Gail barges into Katie's room and forces her to sing. Then, after shoving Luke out of the house, Gail plans to get Bev a record deal by using Katie's voice. Bev is reluctant, but goes along with this in order to win Luke's affections.

At school, Katie and her best friend, aspiring dancer Angela (Jessalyn Wanlim), hear Luke singing in the music room with his best friend, Mickey O'Malley, ("Knockin"). The entranced Katie writes a song of her own for him and admits that she likes him. Angela urges Katie to sing for him at the Bollywood Ball that night, and gives her a costume to wear. Then Gail barges in, forcing Angela to hide.

Gail orders her stepdaughter to babysit Victor tonight, since she wants Bev to win Luke over at the Ball. Katie pleads with Ravi (Manu Narayan), Gail's guru (who is no real guru but just a half-Italian/half-Indian method actor and former KFC worker from New Jersey, named Tony Gupta, who needed the work) to watch Victor while she goes to the Ball. There Katie leads Luke outside and sings ("Extra Ordinary"). He is entranced by her voice. Angela distracts and challenges Gail to a Bollywood dance-off ("Oh Mere Dilruba"). Gail loses and then leaves the Ball. Katie tries to beat her stepmother home, but with no success. Now it's Katie's turn to get blackmailed: Gail vows to expel Angela from the Academy, which will ruin her chances of getting into Juilliard — unless Katie sings for Bev. To save Angela's dance career, Katie goes along with Gail's plot. Gail informs Katie that she's grounded for disobeying her and going to the Ball.

Luke wants to find the girl who sang for him, despite Ms. Dorothy Plumberg the assistant principal trying to punish him with detention and being chased by a crazy girl. In the music room, he sees Bev lip-syncing to Katie's voice ("Make You Believe"). Jumping to the obvious-but-wrong conclusion, Luke falls for Bev and invites her to write more songs with him. Much to Bev's horror, he treats her out to a restaurant that evening. Luke is amazed by Bev's musical aptitude, unaware that Katie is texting to her what she should say (because Bev forced her to help), but ends in disaster. The next day, Luke drops by the house and hits it off with Victor, to whom he gives guitar lessons. Katie also reconnects with Luke, who doesn't like it when she has to head out again — this time, to throw away Gail's prized portrait that French painter, Maurice, was doing for her, which Victor has ruined by cutting out her face with his mother's Ghandi knife. Bev cuts in on Luke, whom she then forces her brother to help her deceive by using miniature electronic-communication devices, so that Katie can coach her through another date. Katie puts together a song on the spot ("Possibilities"), which Luke sings, thinking it's Bev's. She and Luke kiss, which breaks Katie's heart.

Luke falls in love with Bev, unaware that her singing and songwriting talents are actually Katie's. Later, to ensure Katie's cooperation, Gail reveals that she has discovered a loophole that allows her access to the savings account Katie's late father had opened for his daughter; ergo, if Katie doesn't submit to her stepfamily's will, Gail will cut her off without a cent. Victor overhears, learning in the process that his family's money is rightfully Katie's. As it turns out, Victor himself is frequently mistreated by his sister and their mom; he shares no more affection with them than Katie does, and he only went along with their mistreatment of Katie because he was fearful of what they would do to him if he didn't. Feeling guilty over not having had a better relationship with his stepsister over the years — among other things, she's the only one who remembers his birthday — Victor agrees to help expose the fraud perpetrated by his family.

At the showcase, Victor sabotages Bev's performance (of "Make You Believe") by destroying her iPhone which contains Katie's recorded singing voice, to Gail's anger, and Katie and Bev's worry. Frantically trying to cover up the situation by telling the audience that her mic has stopped working, Bev receives booing onstage from the audience. Gail, refusing to give up, forces Katie to sing live backstage. Curious, Luke goes backstage to see what's happening; and he sees Katie. At first, he is confused as Katie tries to get him to leave, but she soon admits to Luke that Bev can't sing. He realizes at last that Bev is a fake and that beautiful voice is actually Katie's.

During Bev's second performance, Luke steals a video camera and films Katie singing backstage, thus exposing the whole charade. At the same time, Angela pushes Katie onto the stage to finish the song, much to Bev's humiliation as she runs off. The audience and Luke persuade Katie onstage to perform her demo ("Bless Myself"). Katie and Luke admit their feelings for each other and kiss and embrace. Guy also loves Katie's performance, and green-lights Luke to produce an album for her, which is for Kensington Records. He even agrees to help Angela get into Juilliard.

In a mid-credits scene, Gail weakly attempts to appeal to Guy, but having had enough of her lies, he decides to tell the school board of her deceit and fraud, causing her to be removed as headmistress of Wellesley Academy. To Gail's surprise, even Bev is delighted to be rid of her mother, being no stranger herself to Gail's manipulative ways. Gail soon finds herself back to where she started decades before: singing (horribly) at a ranch, where she is bombarded with fruit and booed off the stage.

Cast
 Lucy Hale as Katie Gibbs
 Freddie Stroma as Luke Morgan
 Missi Pyle as Gail Van Ravensway
 Megan Park as Beverly "Bev" Van Ravensway
 Matthew Lintz as Victor Van Ravensway
 Jessalyn Wanlim as Angela
 Manu Narayan as Ravi / Tony Gupta 
 Titus Makin Jr. as Mickey O'Malley
 Dikran Tulaine as Guy Morgan
 Lucy Davenport as Ms. Plumberg 
 Onira Tares as Crazy Girl
 Madison McMillin as Girl Nearby

Soundtrack

The accompanying soundtrack album was released on September 6, 2011 by WaterTower Music (the same day as the film's release).

Track listing

Sample credit
 "Bless Myself" contains an interpolation of the 1964 song "You Really Got Me" by The Kinks.

Songs that are not included on the soundtrack album:
 "She's Terrible" by Lucy Hale
 "I Ain't Gonna Leap" by Missi Pyle
 "Party All Night" by Fabio Legarda
 "I Love the Way You Love Me" by Onira Tares 
 "Caribbean Girl" by Fabio Legarda
 "Not My Color, Not My Size" by James Renald
 "Out Here" by Oral Majority
 "Ramón's Jam" by Ramón Stagnaro
 "Make You Believe" by Missi Pyle
 "Amazing Grace" by John Newton

Critical reception
Mike McGranaghan of The Aisle Seat scored the film one and  out of four, said: "A Cinderella Story: Once Upon a Song is like a movie version of iCarly or Victorious or any of those other tween girl shows that combine broad physical humor, mild expressions of pubescent sexuality and fantasies of becoming famous". The DVD Sleuth gave the film 1 out of 2.

References

External links
 
 

2010s musical comedy films
2010s teen comedy films
2011 direct-to-video films
2011 films
American dance films
American direct-to-video films
American musical comedy films
American sequel films
American teen comedy films
American teen musical films
Direct-to-video comedy films
Direct-to-video sequel films
Films based on Cinderella
Films shot in North Carolina
Films set in Massachusetts
Films set in Memphis, Tennessee
Films set in 2012
Films directed by Damon Santostefano
Warner Bros. direct-to-video films
2011 comedy films
A Cinderella Story (film series)
2010s English-language films
2010s American films